The 1972–73 NBA season was the Bucks' fifth season in the NBA.

Draft picks

Roster

Regular season

Season standings

z – clinched division title
y – clinched division title
x – clinched playoff spot

Record vs. opponents

Game log

Playoffs

|- align="center" bgcolor="#ccffcc"
| 1
| March 30
| Golden State
| W 110–90
| Abdul-Jabbar, Robertson (22)
| Kareem Abdul-Jabbar (24)
| Oscar Robertson (12)
| Milwaukee Arena10,746
| 1–0
|- align="center" bgcolor="#ffcccc"
| 2
| April 1
| Golden State
| L 92–95
| Kareem Abdul-Jabbar (26)
| Kareem Abdul-Jabbar (15)
| five players tied (3)
| Milwaukee Arena10,379
| 1–1
|- align="center" bgcolor="#ccffcc"
| 3
| April 5
| @ Golden State
| W 113–93
| Oscar Robertson (34)
| Kareem Abdul-Jabbar (18)
| Oscar Robertson (8)
| Oakland–Alameda County Coliseum Arena8,493
| 2–1
|- align="center" bgcolor="#ffcccc"
| 4
| April 7
| @ Golden State
| L 97–102
| Kareem Abdul-Jabbar (25)
| Perry, Abdul-Jabbar (14)
| Oscar Robertson (7)
| Oakland–Alameda County Coliseum Arena8,173
| 2–2
|- align="center" bgcolor="#ffcccc"
| 5
| April 10
| Golden State
| L 97–100
| four players tied (19)
| Perry, Abdul-Jabbar (12)
| Oscar Robertson (11)
| University of Wisconsin Field House12,204
| 2–3
|- align="center" bgcolor="#ffcccc"
| 6
| April 13
| @ Golden State
| L 86–100
| Kareem Abdul-Jabbar (27)
| Kareem Abdul-Jabbar (14)
| Lucius Allen (5)
| Oakland–Alameda County Coliseum Arena13,175
| 2–4
|-

Player statistics

Season

Playoffs

Transactions

Free agents

Awards and records
 Kareem Abdul-Jabbar, All-NBA First Team

References

Milwaukee
Milwaukee Bucks seasons
Milwau
Milwau